James Andrew "Jim" Harrell III (born October 8, 1974 in Elkin, North Carolina) served three terms as a  Democratic member of the North Carolina General Assembly representing the state's ninetieth House district, including constituents in Alleghany and Surry counties.  Harrell is originally from Elkin, North Carolina and later moved to Roaring Gap. As of 2011, Harrell is a lobbyist, running his own firm, James A. Harrell III and Associates, LLC, in Raleigh.

Early life and education
Harrell earned the Eagle Scout designation as a youth, like many members of his family. Harrell is a graduate of Hampden–Sydney College and the Emory University School of Law.  While a law student, Harrell worked for the District Attorney's office in Fulton County, Georgia. He also served as a law clerk for North Carolina Supreme Court justice Franklin Freeman.

Political career
Harrell was elected to the House in 2002 and re-elected in 2004. He was elected to a third term on November 7, 2006 with over 60 percent of the vote. In 2008, he was narrowly defeated for re-election by Republican Sarah Stevens.

During his final term, the 2007-2008 session, Harrell was chairman of both the House committees on Ways and Means and on Pensions and Retirement. He served as chairman of the Environment and Natural Resources committee in his second term and of Judiciary Committee II in the second half of his first term.  Harrell also chaired or co-chaired select committees on Economic Development and on the rural economy in 2006.

While serving in the legislature, Harrell founded a summer program to teach high school students about government and politics, named the James A. Harrell Jr. School of Government, after his father, a Surry County commissioner and candidate for the U.S. House of Representatives in 2004.

Electoral history

2008

2006

2004

2002

References

1974 births
Living people
People from Elkin, North Carolina
Hampden–Sydney College alumni
Emory University alumni
Emory University School of Law alumni
Democratic Party members of the North Carolina House of Representatives
21st-century American politicians
People from Alleghany County, North Carolina